Janae Shamp is an American politician and registered nurse. Shamp was elected in 2022 to serve in the Arizona State Senate representing District 29 as a member of the Republican Party. Shamp was one of several legislative candidates endorsed by former President Donald Trump in Arizona, defeating incumbent State Representative Joanne Osborne in the Republican primary.

References

Year of birth missing (living people)
Living people
Republican Party Arizona state senators
21st-century American politicians